Stara Vyzhivka is an urban settlement (town) in Volyn Oblast (province), located in the historic region of the Volhynia. It is an administrative seat of the Stara Vyzhivka Raion. Population:

References

External links
 Stara Vyzhivka at the Ukrainian Soviet Encyclopedia

Urban-type settlements in Kovel Raion